Magnolia montana is a species of Magnolia native to the western Malesia region (Malaysia and Indonesia) of the Indomalayan realm.

The Latin specific epithet montana refers to mountains or coming from mountains.

References

External links

 Magnolia classification from the Magnolia Society.
 Global Biodiversity Information Facility: Magnolia montana

montana